Barejadi Nandej railway station is a railway station under Western Railway zone in Gujarat state, India. Barejadi Nandej railway station is 17 km far away from Ahmedabad railway station. Passenger, MEMU and few Express trains halt at Barejadi Nandej railway station.

Location 
This railway station is located in the village of Barejadi, Daskroi Taluka, Ahmedabad district, Gujarat.

Nearby stations 

Kanij is nearest railway station towards Vadodara, whereas  is nearest railway station towards Ahmedabad.

Major trains

Following Express trains halt at Barejadi Nandej railway station in both direction:

 19033/34 Gujarat Queen
 19215/16 Saurashtra Express
 19035/36 Vadodara–Ahmedabad Intercity Express
 22953 Gujarat Express

References 

Railway stations in Ahmedabad
Vadodara railway division